Andrei Sergeyevich Kalaychev (born 26 October 1963) is a retired Soviet and Russian football player.

Honours
 Soviet Top League bronze: 1991.

International career
Kalaychev played his only game for USSR on February 21, 1989, in a friendly against Bulgaria.

References
 Profile on RusTeam

External links
 

1963 births
Sportspeople from Kaluga
Living people
Soviet footballers
Association football midfielders
Soviet Union international footballers
Russian footballers
FC Lokomotiv Moscow players
FC Torpedo Moscow players
Soviet Top League players
Russian Premier League players
Russian expatriate footballers
Expatriate footballers in Austria
FC Lokomotiv Kaluga players
FC Iskra Smolensk players